Katarina Pranješ (born 7 October 2002) is a Croatian footballer who plays as a defender for Women's First League club ŽNK Split and the Croatia women's national team.

Club career
Pranješ has played for ŽNK Osijek and Split in Croatia.

International career
Pranješ made her senior debut for Croatia at senior level on 27 November 2020 as an 89th-minute substitution in a 1-0 home win over Lithuania during the UEFA Women's Euro 2022 qualifying.

International goals

References

External links

2002 births
Living people
Croatian women's footballers
Women's association football defenders
ŽNK Osijek players
ŽNK Split players
Croatia women's international footballers